AN/SPS-29 is a two-dimensional (giving only Range and Bearing) radar that was manufactured by General Electric. It was used by the US Navy as a early warning radar after World War II, and was equipped aboard naval ships during the Cold War. Variants include AN/SPS-29A, AN/SPS-29B, AN/SPS-29C, AN/SPS-29D and AN/SPS-29E. After modernization, it was redesignated as AN/SPS-37.

AN/SPS-29 
During World War II, the U.S. Navy started with CXAM, which was commissioned in 1940, as an air search radar for large ships such as battleships and aircraft carriers. They have deployed radars that use bands (then called VHF).

In the 1950s, post-war generation radars using the same frequency band were required, and the AN/SPS-17 developed by General Electric was first adopted for large ships, and since 1957. Delivery has started. In addition, AN/SPS-28 developed by Westinghouse using the same antenna was also adopted for destroyers, and delivery began in the same year. However, although the antenna is common, the peak power of AN/SPS-17 was 750 kW (1.5 MW depending on the version), while that of AN/SPS-28 was 250 kW, which is a considerable difference. Therefore, it was inferior in detection ability. For this reason, this machine was developed with the goal of exhibiting the same weight as the AN/SPS-28 and the same performance as the AN/SPS-17.

Design 
As the antenna, a mattress type is adopted like AN/SPS-28, and the dipole antennas are arranged in 7 rows x 4 stages, and the AS- with the antenna of the identification friend or foe (IFF) incorporated in the upper part. A 943 antenna was used. However, AN/SPS-29D uses a smaller antenna.

In AS-943, these dipole antennas were arranged at a distance of half the wavelength in the vertical and horizontal directions, and at a distance of one-fourth of the wavelength from the planar reflector. The beam width is 20 x 25.5 °, which is not much different from the AN/SPS-28's 19 x 27 °, but the pulse width is significantly longer from 4 microseconds to 10 microseconds. To compensate for this decrease in distance resolution, the number of pulse repetitions increased from 150 pps to 300 pps.

On board ships

United States 
 Essex-class aircraft carrier
 Galveston-class cruiser
 Providence-class cruiser
  USS Atalanta
 Charles F. Adams-class destroyer
 Coontz-class destroyer
 Farragut-class destroyer
 Forrest Sherman-class destroyer
 Mitscher-class destroyer
 Gearing-class destroyer (FRAM)
 Allen M. Sumner-class destroyer (FRAM)
 Fletcher-class destroyer (FRAM)
 Hamilton-class cutter
 Guardian-class radar picket ship

Japan 
 JDS Amatsukaze

AN/SPS-37 
This machine was continuously improved in the order of AN/SPS-29A, AN/SPS-29B, and AN/SPS-29C, and AN/SPS-29D with a smaller antenna was also manufactured for the United States Coast Guard.

It then evolved into AN/SPS-37, which introduced pulse compression technology, and AN/SPS-43, which had enhanced electronic protection capabilities. However, due to its long wavelength and low resolution, it was replaced by radar with shorter wavelengths than AN/SPS-40, and disappeared in the US Navy due to the retirement of the on board ship. It was widely used overseas as well as on board ships (mainly Sumner-class / Gearing-class destroyers), but it also disappeared with the retirement of the onboard ships.

On board ships

United States 
 Essex-class aircraft carrier
 Independence-class aircraft carrier
 USS Norfolk
 Baltimore-class cruiser
 Providence-class cruiser
 Forrest Sherman-class destroyer
 Mitscher-class destroyer
 Gearing-class destroyer (FRAM)
 Allen M. Sumner-class destroyer (FRAM)
 Fletcher-class destroyer (FRAM)
 Guardian-class radar picket ship

See More 

 List of radars
 Radar configurations and types
 Early warning radar

Citations

References 
 Norman Friedman (2006). The Naval Institute Guide to World Naval Weapon Systems.  Naval Institute Press.  ISBN 
 Self-Defense Force Equipment Yearbook 2006-2007. Asaun News Agency. ISBN 4-7509-1027-9

Naval radars
Military radars of Japan
Military radars of the United States
Military equipment introduced in the 1950s